is a Japanese financial company. It is listed on the Nikkei 225.

History

Today its primary business is providing online securities trading services.

References

Financial services companies established in 1931
Financial services companies based in Tokyo
Companies listed on the Tokyo Stock Exchange
1931 establishments in Japan